Thompson Sound may refer to

Thompson Sound, British Columbia, an unincorporated locality
Thompson Sound (British Columbia), a sound in the area of the Broughton Archipelago
Thompson Sound (New Zealand), an indentation in the coast of Fiordland National Park, New Zealand